A tabagie is a room designated for smoking tobacco and socializing.

In modern Quebec French, tabagie refers to a tobacco shop, which in Parisian French is called a bureau de tabac.

See also 
Tabagie (feast)

References

Rooms
Smoking